The Latin Tropical Airplay chart is a music chart that ranks the best-performing tropical songs of the United States. The chart has since been renamed to the Tropical Songs chart. Published by Billboard magazine, the data are compiled by Nielsen SoundScan based on each single's weekly airplay. The lists contains the number-one Latin Tropical Airplay tracks of 2001.

Chart history

References

2001
United States Latin Tropical Airplay
2001 in Latin music